Ella's Kitchen is a company that makes organic baby and toddler food, sold in supermarkets internationally including in the UK, China, Norway, Denmark, Sweden, Ireland, Iceland, Finland, Belgium, Netherlands, Romania, Canada and the United States. Ella's Kitchen has a 30% share of the UK baby food sector and a global turnover of $121m. Ella's Kitchen was founded in the UK in 2006 and is a member of The Soil Association and The Organic Trade Board.

History

Founding and acquisition 
The Henley-based Ella's Kitchen was founded in 2006 by Paul Lindley. After graduating from the University of Bristol he trained and qualified as a Chartered Accountant at KPMG in London and Los Angeles. He then spent nine years at Nickelodeon as deputy managing director before setting up Ella's Kitchen. The business is named after Paul's daughter, Ella.

The company launched in Scandinavia and the US in 2009 and now has a presence in sixteen markets.

In May 2013, it was announced that Ella's Kitchen had been sold to The Hain Celestial Group, Inc., a North American natural and organic products company.

Campaigns 
In February 2013, Paul Lindley, founder and CEO, launched a campaign focused on childhood nutrition called Averting A Recipe For Disaster. A report of the same name was released at the time, including comments and support from representatives of the food and health industries, charity sector and media including Prue Leith, Tom Aikens, David Haslam (Chairman of the National Obesity Forum), Carmel McConnell (founder of Magic Breakfast), Rob Rees MBE (Chair of The School Food Trust) and Sheila Dillon (presenter of BBC Radio 4's Food Programme). The report outlined the need for a ‘Food Manifesto for the Under Fives’, a long term, cross-party plan to improve nutrition for the under-fives and a series of recommendations about what might be included in it. In September 2013, Leicester City Council announced that it would be a year long pilot city to trial ideas and themes emerging from the report. This resulted in the Start Smart initiative launching in Leicester in March 2014, which promotes collaboration between businesses, government and communities to raise awareness of healthy eating for the under-fives.

In 2015, Ella's Kitchen partnered with children's charity Save the Children, for a limited edition Jingle Belly Christmas Dinner pouch. 30p from every sale was donated to Save the Children's FAST (Families and Schools Together) programme. Also in 2015 they launched ‘EllaCycle’, a scheme aiming to help parents learn how they can recycle and reuse all the different types of Ella's Kitchen packaging.

In February 2016. Ella's Kitchen was awarded certification as a B Corporation. In May of that year, it launched a new campaign, Veg for Victory, aiming to raise awareness of the benefits of starting weaning with vegetables.

Products

Ella's Kitchen currently has 216 products, suitable for babies aged from 4 months to 3+ years, including baby and toddler food, smoothies, snack ranges and more, all featuring organic ingredients. It was the first brand to bring pouches to the baby food market.

The products contain no added sugar, salt, water, additives, E numbers or GM ingredients.

Awards 
Awards won by the company include:

 Mum's Choice Overall Award Winner at the Tesco Mums’ Choice Awards 2011 
 Best Organic Baby Food 2011 Prima Baby Reader Awards
 International Business of the Year at the Growing Business Fast Growth Business Awards 2011 
 Food and Drink Brand of the Year at The Grocer Gold Awards 2010. 
 High Growth Business of the Year award at the Private Business Awards,
 an excellence award for Innovation at the 2012 Fast Track 100 event.
 The International Growth Business of the Year award at the 2012 National Business Awards 
 Healthy Snacks winner in the Red Tricycle Totally Awesome Awards.
 Innovation of the Year award at the Norway Grocery Association Awards
 Grocery Brand of the Year in Sweden

Ella's Kitchen ranked in the Sunday Times Fast Track 100 list in 2011, 2009, 2010, 2012 and 2016.

References

Food and drink companies established in 2006
Companies based in Oxfordshire
Certified B Corporations in the Food & Beverage Industry
Food and drink companies of England
Baby food manufacturers
Henley-on-Thames
2006 establishments in England